Bun Rany (born, 15 December 1954) is the wife of long-time Cambodian Prime Minister Hun Sen, First Lady of Cambodia.  She has served as the vice president of the National Association of the Cambodian Red Cross and, since 1998, as its president. She has received national and international recognition and numerous awards for her work with Cambodia's orphans and poor, HIV/AIDS awareness and prevention, and her emphasis on women's issues with efforts to improve domestic safety and empowerment through education and vocational training. Her full honorary title is Samdech Kittipritbandit Bun Rany Hun Sen.

Titles
As the wife of the Prime Minister, she was previously referred to as Lok Chumteav Bun Rany - Hun Sen (Khmer: លោកជំទាវប៊ុន រ៉ានី ហ៊ុន សែន). Lok Chumteav is a title for high-ranking female officials or the wives of high-ranking ministers or government officials. The name of her husband follows to indicate her title is due to her status as Hun Sen's wife. On 30 March 2011, Cambodian king Norodom Sihamoni granted her the title Kittipritbandit (Khmer: កិត្តិព្រឹទ្ធបណ្ឌិត), a title meaning roughly "Celebrated Senior Sage/Scholar/PhD" and equivalent to an honorary Doctorate in the Royal Academy of Cambodia. On 8 May 2013, King Sihamoni awarded her the title Samdech (Khmer: សម្ដេច), the highest bestowed title in the Khmer kingdom, thus making her full title Samdech Kittipritbandit Bun Rany Hun Sen (Khmer: សម្ដេចកិត្តិព្រឹទ្ធបណ្ឌិតប៊ុន រ៉ានី ហ៊ុន សែន).  Although she should technically be addressed as Samdech, she is often informally referenced as Lok Chumtiew.

Early life
Bun Rany was born Bun Sam Hieng to a Chinese-Khmer family in what was then the province of Kampong Cham, Cambodia in Roka Khnao, Krouch Chhmar District (now a part of Tbong Khmum Province). Her parents, Lin Kri and Bun Sieng Ly, were prosperous farmers who traced their ancestry to Kwangtung (Guangdong) in China. Rany has two brothers and three sisters. As children, before the Cambodian Civil War, they all walked half an hour to school, wading across the Roka Khnao River in the dry season or hitching a ferry ride across in the wet season when the water was too deep to cross. She has stated that her maternal grandparents' gentle instruction in Cambodian tradition was very influential in her later life. In 1970, when Rany was 16 years old, her grandparents died. Shortly thereafter, Prince Sihanouk was deposed by General Lon Nol. These two events deeply affected her and when the exiled Prince aligned with the Communist Khmer Rouge and issued a call for Cambodians to fight against Lon Nol's government, Rany secretly joined the National United Front of Kampuchea. The local cadres gave her a choice of positions. She chose the medical field and the leadership arranged for her training by doctors who had come from Phnom Penh to lecture fresh recruits. After six months of Khmer Rouge training, she was sent back to Krouch Chhmar with the title of Public Health Officer. By 1974, she was the director of a Khmer Rouge hospital located approximately 50 km from the front line of fighting against Lon Nol's Khmer Republic government forces.

Marriage to Hun Sen
In March 1974, Rany met Hun Sen (through Le Duc Tho) who, having joined the Khmer Rouge in 1970, commanded most of the soldiers that were treated at her hospital. As the Khmer Rouge leadership forbade fraternization among the people and strictly controlled every facet of life, including courtship and marriage, they carried on a romance through intermediaries and occasionally on the pretense of official Party business. Hun Sen officially requested the Angkar to allow a marriage in late 1974 but despite his reputation as a good leader, was told to wait until Phnom Penh was captured and the whole country was under Khmer Rouge rule. In 1975, one day before the fall of Phnom Penh, Hun Sen was hit by shrapnel and lost his left eye. Considering him now to be disabled, Bun Rany's superiors decided he was not suitable for marriage and instead attempted to arrange for her to marry a series of prominent men in Krouch Chhmar District, all of whom she rejected. Likewise, Hun Sen's superiors attempted to find a "more suitable" partner for him, suggesting, among others, a high-ranking Party woman twelve years his senior. Their refusal to follow the orders of their superiors led to lowered esteem and suspicion of loyalties. In early 1976, the Angkar organized a group marriage ceremony with twelve wounded and handicapped soldiers and notified Hun Sen and Bun Rany that they could marry as part of this event. The group wedding took place with little ceremony in a very remote location with no family members in attendance. They were told to live in Memot District where Hun Sen was stationed on the border with Vietnam while Rany was assigned to work long hours in neighbouring Ponhea Kraek and Tboung Khmum districts. On 10 November 1976, Bun Rany gave birth to their first child in Memot, a son whom they named Kamsot (meaning "sad") that died later the same day as a result of being dropped by a Khmer Rouge nurse, Rany claims.

Currently Hun Sen and Rany have six children, four sons (one of them deceased) and three daughters (one of them adopted). Their names are Komsot (deceased), Manet, Mana, Manit, Mani, Mali and Malis.

Activities as First Lady
 
In 1977, the Khmer Rouge began internal purges directed at those suspected of disloyalty. Hun Sen, who had risen to the rank of Battalion Commander, became paranoid and fled with his followers into Vietnam where they joined a rebel army and replacement government organized by the Vietnamese in advance of its effort to overthrow the Khmer Rouge regime. Bun Rany, who was left behind, was imprisoned by the Khmer Rouge and would not see her husband again until almost two years later when the Vietnamese invaded Cambodia in 1979. Upon defeating the Khmer Rouge and occupying Cambodia, the Vietnamese named Hun Sen as Deputy Prime Minister and freed Bun Rany who then began organizing orphanages and schools for the orphans left behind by the genocidal policies of the Khmer Rouge. In 1985, Hun Sen was appointed Prime Minister, giving Bun Rany a better platform to expand both her economic activities and her humanitarian work. During the post-1988 process of Thai-Cambodian rapprochement, she forged a close personal relationship with the wife of Thai Prime Minister Chatichai Choonhavan, and became deeply involved in the rapidly growing legal and illegal trade between Cambodia and Thailand. From her position as first lady, she began to call attention to the plight of those infected with HIV/AIDS, the poor and women's issues. In April 1994 at the first congress of the Cambodian Red Cross, she was elected as its Vice President while Princess Eng Marie, wife of then Co-Prime Minister Prince Norodom Ranariddh was elected president. At its second congress in 1998, Bun Rany was elected President after Hun Sen consolidated his power by violently ousting and exiling Ranariddh.

Some of the highlights of her tenure thus far have been the establishment of five development centers located throughout Cambodia aimed at providing vocational and business training to women and the poor, organizing and delivering aid to victims of floods that regularly inundate Cambodia (2000, 2011 and 2013, among others) and efforts supporting the UN Secretary-General's Action Plan for Women and Children's Health.

Criticism and controversy
As the former communist wife of a leader who is widely considered a despotic dictator, Bun Rany is not without detractors.  For instance, in 2003 Noranarith Anandayath, adviser to Prince Ranariddh, accused her of politicizing the Red Cross, a worldwide organization whose reputation is founded on its political neutrality, by funneling money from her husband's Cambodian People's Party (CPP) to villagers during an election when parties were prohibited from "making gifts" to voters.

In October 2013 critics including Prince Sisowath Thomico and Sam Rainsy accused her of abusing her position when, at a Cambodian Red Cross flood relief event in Pailin, she spent the majority of her speech denouncing the opposition Cambodia National Rescue Party (CNRP) in the wake of a controversial national election that spawned some of the biggest protests Cambodia has seen in decades.

In October 1999, following the public assassination of popular Cambodian actress Pisith Pilika, the French magazine L’Express claimed that the actress’ diary recounted a love affair with Hun Sen and named Bun Rany as the mastermind behind the shooting; the magazine also claimed that on her deathbed the actress had named Bun Rany to several people.  Bun Rany quickly denied these charges, and announced that she would press charges against L’Express for defamation. However, no charges were ever brought against L'Express.

Special interest groups

Cambodia, officially a multiparty democracy, in reality "remains a one-party state dominated by the Cambodian People's Party and Prime Minister Hun Sen, Bun's husband, a former Khmer Rouge official in power since 1985. The open doors to new investment during his reign have yielded the most access to a coterie of cronies of his and his wife, Bun Rany".

Awards and honours
The following is a list of awards and honours accumulated by Lok Chumtiew Bun Rany.
November 2006 - Joint UN Program on HIV/AIDS and the Asia Pacific Leadership Forum (APLF) recognise Bun Rany as an APLF Outstanding Champion
October 2008 - Honourary Doctorate in Humanity from the University of Cambodia
June 2009 - Honourary Doctorate in Economic Science from the Women's University of Seoul
July 2010 - Honourary Doctorate in Literature from the Jeon Ju University of South Korea
April 2010 - Honourary Doctorate in Education from Silla University, Busan, South Korea
March 2011 - Granted title Kittiprittbandit of the Royal Academy of Cambodia by King Sihamoni

References

External links
Hun Sen's early career
Official Biography from a Government site
Transcript of a Speech by Hun Sen referring to his early life

1954 births
Living people
Cambodian Buddhists
Cambodian people of Chinese descent
20th-century Cambodian women
21st-century Cambodian women
Hun Sen
People from Kampong Cham province
People from Tboung Khmum province
Spouses of prime ministers of Cambodia
Spouses of national leaders
Controversies in Cambodia
Hun family